USS Silenus was a Motor Torpedo Boat Tender in service with the United States Navy during World War II. She was laid down by Chicago Bridge and Iron on 28 October 1943 as LST-519. She was redesignated LST-604 on 18 December 1943 and launched on 20 March 1944. She was commissioned on 8 April 1944. LST-604 was decommissioned on 29 April 1944, at Maryland Drydock Co., Baltimore MD. for conversion to a Motor Torpedo Boat Tender. It lasted 104 days, the now USS Silenus, was recommissioned on 9 August 1944. On 14 March 1947 she was decommissioned and on 25 July 1947, she was scrapped. During World War II, USS Silenus was assigned to the Asiatic-Pacific Theater.

Awards
World War II Victory Medal
Navy Occupation Service Medal (with Asia clasp)
American Campaign Medal
Asiatic-Pacific Campaign Medal

External links
 NavSource-USS Silenus AGP-11

1944 ships
Portunus-class motor torpedo boat tenders
Ships built in Chicago